American rapper ASAP Ferg has released two studio albums, three mixtapes, one extended play and forty eight singles (including twenty three as a featured artist and six promotional singles).

Studio albums

EPs

Mixtapes

Singles

As lead artist

As featured artist

Promotional singles

Other charted songs

Guest appearances

Music videos

See also
 ASAP Mob discography

Notes

References

Discographies of American artists
Hip hop discographies